.cz is the country code top-level domain (ccTLD) for the Czech Republic. It is administered by CZ.NIC. Registrations must be ordered via accredited domain name registrars.

Until Czechoslovakia was dissolved in 1993, it used the domain .cs.

The maximum domain name length permitted is 63 characters, which may only be alphanumeric or the hyphen (-). Hyphens are restricted in that they may not be the first or last character, neither may they appear consecutively. As of 2013, there are six domains which use the maximum of 63 characters.

History
The .cz domain came into effect in January 1993, following the dissolution of Czechoslovakia.
In 2009, new European Union legislation came into effect, allowing the use of diacritics in second-level domains under the .eu domain only. Czech customers were among the most interested in the new domains, only Germans bought more, with the French in third. The .cz domain, operated by the CZ.NIC association, continued to only offer standard characters, citing insufficient demand and lower accessibility from abroad as reasons behind their decision.

Over 850,000 internet sites had been registered as .cz by the end of 2011. In 2012, the number exceeded one million. The Czech Republic was therefore the 12th European Union member state with a top-level domain to top a million active domain names.

At the end of 2011, CZ.NIC reported that ownership of all domains, 58% were by individuals, whereas those held by organisations accounted for a minority of 42%. Domains were most popular in Prague, followed by Brno and Ostrava.

References

External links
 IANA .cz whois information

Country code top-level domains
 
Council of European National Top Level Domain Registries members
Computer-related introductions in 1993

sv:Toppdomän#C